Archives Wales is a web resource that allows cross-searching of Welsh archive collections. It was founded in 1995 as Archives Council Wales and was renamed to Archives and Records Council Wales (ARCW) in 2004. The archives are described at collection level only, although the ultimate intention is to allow for searching at item level. In July 2009, after a major refurbishment funded by CyMAL: Museums Archives and Libraries Wales, it was relaunched as Archives Wales, or Archifau Cymru in the  Welsh language. The URL is Archives.Wales or archifau.cymru 

Archives Wales forms part of the UK National Archives Network, a series of online catalogues which together cover local authority, HE and specialist archive repositories in all parts of the UK. The other key parts of the network are:

A2A (Access to Archives, collections in English local record offices),
AIM25 (Archives in the M25 area),
The Archives Hub (Archives of UK HE and FE institutions),
SCAN (Scottish Archives Network)

Member organisations 
 
 Wrexham Archives and Local Studies Service
 Conwy Archive Service
 Bangor University Archives and Special Collections
 Anglesey Archives
 Gwynedd Archive Service
 Ceredigion Archives, Aberystwyth
 Royal Commission on the Ancient and Historical Monuments of Wales, Aberystwyth
 Aberystwyth University Archives, Hugh Owen Library, Aberystwyth
 Roderic Bowen Library & Archives, University of Wales Trinity Saint David, Lampeter
 Pembrokeshire Archives and Local Studies
 Carmarthenshire Archive Service
 Richard Burton Archives, Swansea
 West Glamorgan Archive Service, Swansea
 Neath Antiquarian Society Archives
 North East Wales Archives
 Glamorgan Archives, Cardiff
 Gwent Archives
 National Library of Wales, Aberystwyth
 Powys Archives
 Royal Welsh College of Music and Drama
 Special Collections and Archives, Cardiff University
 West Glamorgan Archive Service

References

BBC News Wales website

External links
Archives Wales Website

Welsh websites
Mass media in Wales